Drzazgi may refer to:

 Drzazgi, Działdowo County, village in Poland
 Drzazgi, Olsztyn County, village in Poland